Asem (also spelled Aasem, Assem, Asim, Assim  ) is a male given name of Arabic origin, which means "savior, protector, guardian, defender." Asem is also a female given name of Kazakh origin, which means "beauty, beautiful, refined, graceful, elegant, excellent, splendid, magnificent." It is not related to the Indian given name Asim.

Given name
 Asim ibn Omar, famous Tabi'un and Early Hadith scholar.
 Umm Asim bint Asim, was the mother of Umayyad caliph Umar II (r. 717–720) and wife of Abd al-Aziz ibn Marwan.
 Asim Abdulrahman, Egyptian militant 
 Asım Akin, Turkish physician
 Abu Asim Azmi, Indian politician
 Asım Orhan Barut, Turkish-American theoretical physicist
 Asim Brkan, Bosnian singer, musician and artist
 Asim Ferhatović, Bosnian footballer
 Asim Sarajlić, Bosnian politician
 Asim Peco, Bosnian linguist
 Asim Kurjak, Bosnian scientist
 Asım Can Gündüz, Turkish rock and blues guitarist
 Asım Güzelbey, Turkish politician
 Assem Hammoud, Lebanese alleged Al Qaeda operative
 Assem Jaber, Lebanese diplomat
 Assem Jarrah, great-uncle or distant cousin of Ziad Jarrah
 Assem Marei, Egyptian basketball player
 Asim Kamal, Pakistan Test cricketer
 Abu Muhammad Asem al-Maqdisi, Palestinian political writer
 Prince Asem bin Al Nayef, Jordanian prince
 Assem Qanso, Lebanese politician
 Asim Saeed, Emirati cricketer
 Asem Tasbulatova, Kazakh singer
 Asim Azhar, Pakistani Singer
 Asim zafar, mughal Descendant
 Assim al-Hakeem, Saudi Arabian imam and YouTuber

Surname
 Princess Nejla bint Asem, Jordanian princess
 Princess Sana Asem, Jordanian princess

See also
 Asia–Europe Meeting
 Hashem

External links
 Asim Name Meaning at thinkbabynames
 Asim Name Meaning at my-baby-names

Arabic-language surnames
Arabic masculine given names
Bosniak masculine given names
Bosnian masculine given names
Turkish masculine given names
Kazakh given names